DORIS may refer to:
DORIS III, third incarnation of the Doppel-Ring-Speicher, a storage ring for particles at the Deutsches Elektronen-Synchrotron (DESY)
DORIS (geodesy), or Doppler Orbitography and Radiopositioning Integrated by Satellite, a French satellite system used for the determination of satellite orbits and for positioning